Duje Čop (born 1 February 1990) is a Croatian professional footballer who plays as a forward for Šibenik, on loan from Dinamo Zagreb.

Čop made over 140 appearances and scored over 60 goals in the Croatian First Football League, for Hajduk Split, RNK Split, Dinamo Zagreb and Šibenik, finishing as top scorer as Dinamo won the league in 2013–14. He also played in the top leagues of Portugal, Italy, Spain, Belgium and Slovenia, totalling 80 games and 16 goals in La Liga for Málaga, Sporting Gijón and Valladolid.

Čop earned 14 caps and scored two international goals for Croatia between 2014 and 2018. He was part of their squad at UEFA Euro 2016.

Club career

Hajduk Split / Nacional
Čop turned professional in 2007–08 at only age 17, helping local Hajduk Split finish fifth in the top division. In his first professional season with Hajduk, he made 15 appearances and scored 2 goals. In July 2008, at the end of the season, he joined Nacional in Portugal.

Scarcely used during his only season in Madeira (174 minutes in official games), Čop made his Primeira Liga debut on 24 January 2009 in a 1–1 home draw against Sporting Clube de Portugal. On 6 April, he scored his only goal in Portuguese football, replacing Mateus in added time away to Rio Ave and concluding a 3–0 win.

He subsequently returned to Hajduk, being sparingly used over the course of two campaigns.

RNK Split
In July 2011, Čop terminated his contract with Hajduk and signed a four-year deal with neighbouring RNK Split.

He made his debut for the team in a UEFA Europa League qualifying match against Slovenian side Domžale, scoring a goal in the away win. It was Split's first ever goal in European competitions. He also netted another goal against the same side in the second leg.

Dinamo Zagreb
In June 2012, he moved to defending champions GNK Dinamo Zagreb. He started the season with a goal against Sheriff Tiraspol in UEFA Champions League qualifying match at the Maksimir Stadium. He scored another important goal on Dinamo Zagreb road to 2012–13 Champions League, in the play-off match against Maribor. He made six appearances in the competition's group stage. On 18 February 2013, he scored his first hat-trick for Dinamo Zagreb in a derby match against Rijeka. He finished as the 2013–14 Prva HNL top goalscorer with 22 goals.

Cagliari
On 11 January 2015, Čop transferred to Italian club Cagliari. Three days later, he made his debut for them, playing the full 90 minutes in a 2–1 loss away to Parma in the round of 16 of the 2014–15 Coppa Italia. On 24 January, he scored his first goal in Serie A, the winner in a 2–1 home triumph over Sassuolo, as a substitute for Samuele Longo. On 26 April, he scored twice as the relegation-threatened Sardinians won 3–1 at Fiorentina; he totalled four goals from 16 appearances as the season ended with descent.

On 16 July 2015, Čop moved to Málaga on a season-long loan deal. He made his La Liga debut on 21 August, starting as the campaign began with a goalless home draw against fellow Andalusians Sevilla. On 13 December, Čop scored his first goal for the Boquerones, an 87th-minute winner in a 2–1 victory at Rayo Vallecano. On the same day, he threatened to leave if his playing time would not increase.

In July 2016, Čop was loaned to Sporting de Gijón. On 26 November, he missed a late penalty in a 2–1 away loss against Real Madrid. He totalled nine goals for the Asturians, who were relegated at the end of the season.

Standard Liege
On 30 August 2017, Čop completed a €3 million move to Standard Liège in the Belgian First Division A. He scored his first goal on 20 September to conclude a 4–0 home win over Heist in the sixth round of the cup, followed four days later with a first league goal to equalise in a 2–1 win over Lokeren also at the Stade Maurice Dufrasne.

Čop played mostly as a substitute for Standard. On 17 March, he came on in the 97th minute for Edmilson Junior as they beat Genk 1-0 in extra time to win the 2018 Belgian Cup Final and qualify for the UEFA Europa League.

On 19 August 2018 Čop agreed to a one-year loan deal with Real Valladolid. He did not score in 21 games for the club.

In 2020–21, Čop played only 424 minutes of league football for Standard, being out of the plans of managers Philippe Montanier and Mbaye Leye. He scored once that season, in a 3–2 Europa League group loss at Rangers on 3 December.

Return to Dinamo
In June 2021, Čop returned to Dinamo Zagreb after six years away. Having barely played, he was loaned to Celje of the Slovenian PrvaLiga at the start of February. Again, he played mainly from the bench, including when he scored his only goal for the club from the penalty spot in a 4–2 win at Olimpija Ljubljana.

International career
Čop made his senior international debut for Croatia on 4 September 2014, replacing Luka Modrić for the final 30 minutes of a 3–0 friendly win over Cyprus in Pula.

He made one appearance in Croatia's successful qualification campaign for UEFA Euro 2016; against Bulgaria on 10 October 2015, he came on for Marko Pjaca at the same mark and was sent off at the end of a 3–0 win for a foul on Strahil Popov.

Čop was part of Croatia's Euro 2016 squad and made his UEFA European Championship debut in 2–1 group stage win against defending champions Spain. He scored his first international goal in a 3–0 friendly win over Northern Ireland on 15 November 2016.

In May 2018 Čop was named in Croatia’s preliminary 32-man squad for the 2018 World Cup in Russia, but did not make the final 23.

International goals
Scores and results list Croatia's goal tally first, score column indicates score after each Čop goal.

Personal life
Čop's father Davor was also a footballer and a forward. He played for six seasons with Hajduk Split in the 1970s and 1980s.

Honours

Club
Hajduk Split
Croatian Football Cup: 2009–10

Dinamo Zagreb
Prva HNL: 2012–13, 2013–14
Croatian Super Cup: 2013

Standard Liège
Belgian Cup: 2017–18

Individual
Prva HNL Top goalscorer: 2013–14
SN Yellow Shirt Award: 2013–14

References

External links

Duje Čop at BDFutbol

1990 births
Living people
Sportspeople from Vinkovci
Croatian footballers
Association football forwards
Croatian Football League players
Primeira Liga players
Serie A players
La Liga players
Belgian Pro League players
Slovenian PrvaLiga players
HNK Hajduk Split players
C.D. Nacional players
RNK Split players
GNK Dinamo Zagreb players
Cagliari Calcio players
Málaga CF players
Sporting de Gijón players
Standard Liège players
Real Valladolid players
NK Celje players
HNK Šibenik players
Croatia youth international footballers
Croatia under-21 international footballers
Croatia international footballers
Croatian expatriate footballers
Croatian expatriate sportspeople in Portugal
Croatian expatriate sportspeople in Italy
Croatian expatriate sportspeople in Spain
Croatian expatriate sportspeople in Belgium
Croatian expatriate sportspeople in Slovenia
Expatriate footballers in Portugal
Expatriate footballers in Italy
Expatriate footballers in Spain
Expatriate footballers in Belgium
Expatriate footballers in Slovenia
UEFA Euro 2016 players